Tisey Estanzuela Natural Reserve is a nature reserve in Nicaragua. It is one of the 78 reserves that are under official protection in the country.

External links
 Natural Reserve Tisey Estanzuela - Explore Nicaragua

Protected areas of Nicaragua
Estelí Department
Central American pine–oak forests
Central American montane forests